In  quantum chemistry and physics, the Lieb–Oxford inequality provides a lower bound for the indirect part of the Coulomb energy of a quantum mechanical system. It is named after Elliott H. Lieb and Stephen Oxford.

The inequality is of importance for density functional theory and plays a role in the proof of stability of matter.

Introduction

In classical physics, one can calculate the Coulomb energy of a configuration of charged particles in the following way. First, calculate the charge density , where  is a function of the coordinates  . Second, calculate the Coulomb energy by integrating:

 

The factor of  corrects for double-counting the pairs of points.

More specifically,  is defined as the expectation value of charge density at each point. But in this case, the above formula for Coulomb energy is not correct, due to exchange and correlation effects. The above, classical formula for Coulomb energy is then called the "direct" part of Coulomb energy. To get the actual Coulomb energy, it is necessary to add a correction term, called the "indirect" part of Coulomb energy. The Lieb–Oxford inequality concerns this indirect part. It is relevant in density functional theory, where the expectation value ρ plays a central role.

Statement of the inequality
For a quantum mechanical system of  particles, each with charge , the -particle density is denoted by

The function  is only assumed to be non-negative and normalized. Thus the following applies to particles with any "statistics". For example, if the system is described by a normalised square integrable -particle wave function

then

More generally, in the case of particles with spin having  spin states per particle and with corresponding wave function

the -particle density is given by 

Alternatively, if the system is described by a density matrix , then  is the diagonal

The electrostatic energy of the system is defined as

For , the single particle charge density is given by

and the direct part of the Coulomb energy of the system of  particles is defined as the electrostatic energy associated with the charge density , i.e.

 

The Lieb–Oxford inequality states that the difference between the true energy  and its semiclassical approximation  is bounded from below as

where  is a constant independent of the particle number .  is referred to as the indirect part of the Coulomb energy and in density functional theory more commonly as the exchange plus correlation energy. A similar bound exists if the particles have different charges .

The optimal constant
With these constants the inequality holds for any particle number .

The constant can be further improved if the particle number  is restricted. The corresponding variational equation for the optimal  is the Lane–Emden equation of order 3. For two particles it is known that the smallest possible constant satisfies . In general it can be proved that the optimal constants  increase with the number of particles, i.e. , and converge in the limit of large  to the best constant  in the inequality. Any lower bound on the optimal constant for fixed particle number  is also a lower bound on the optimal constant . The best numerical lower bound was obtained for  where . This bound has been obtained by considering an exponential density. For the same particle number a uniform density gives .

It has been obtained in using a uniform electron gas, melted in the neighborhood of its surface. The same lower bound   had been proved earlier in, and acknowledged as such in.

The Dirac constant
Historically, the first approximation of the indirect part  of the Coulomb energy in terms of the single particle charge density was given by Paul Dirac in 1930 for fermions. The wave function under consideration is

 
With the aim of evoking perturbation theory, one considers the eigenfunctions of the Laplacian in a large cubic box of volume  and sets

 

 

This result can be compared to the lower bound. In contrast to Dirac's approximation the Lieb–Oxford inequality does not include the number  of spin states on the right-hand side.

Generalisations
The constant  in  can be made smaller at the price of adding another term to the right-hand side. Thus, for a uniform density system .

References

Further reading
 

Inequalities
Density functional theory